The Melody Lingers On is an album by trumpeter Dizzy Gillespie recorded in 1966 and released on the Limelight label.

Track listing
 "Winchester Cathedral" (Geoff Stephens) - 2:21 
 "Cherry, Cherry" (Neil Diamond) - 3:46 
 "Summer Samba (Samba de Verão)" (Norman Gimbel, Marcos Valle) - 3:24 
 "Cherish" (Terry Kirkman) - 2:41 
 "Bang! Bang!" (Joe Cuba, Jimmy Sabater) - 3:04 
 "Mas que Nada" (Jorge Ben) - 4:58 
 "Tequila" (Chuck Rio) - 3:15 
 "The Song Is Ended (but the Melody Lingers On)" (Irving Berlin) - 2:27 
 "Portuguese Washerwoman (Les Lavandieres du Portugal)" (André Popp, Roger Antoine Lucchesi) - 2:47 
 "Winter Samba" (Dizzy Gillespie) - 3:11 
 "Get That Money Blues" (Jimmy Owens) - 7:06

Personnel
Dizzy Gillespie - trumpet
James Moody - tenor saxophone, flute
Billy Butler - guitar
Kenny Barron - piano
Frank Schifano - bass, vocals
Otis "Candy" Finch, Jr. - drums
Candido Camero - congas
Panama Francis - percussion

References 

Dizzy Gillespie albums
1967 albums
Albums produced by Hal Mooney
Limelight Records albums